The Diagnostic Classification of Mental Health and Developmental Disorders of Infancy and Early Childhood-Revised (DC: 0-3R) is a developmentally based diagnostic manual that provides clinical criteria for categorizing mental health and developmental disorders in infants and toddlers. It is organized into a five-part axis system. The book has been translated into several languages and its model is widely adopted for the assessment of children up to five years of age.

The DC 0-3R is meant to complement, but not replace, the Diagnostic and Statistical Manual of Mental Disorders (DSM-IV-TR), and the International Statistical Classification of Diseases and Related Health Problems (ICD-10) of the World Health Organization. It is intended to enhance the understanding of young children by making it possible to assess, diagnose, and treat mental health problems in infants and toddlers by allowing for the identification of disorders not addressed in other classification systems.

The DC: 0-3R is organized around three primary principles: 1) that children's psychological functioning unfolds in the context of relationships, 2) that individual differences in temperament and constitutional strengths and vulnerabilities play a major role in how children experience and process events, and 3) that the family's cultural context is important for the understanding of the child's developmental course.

History

The first version, DC: 0-3, was published in 1994 to address the need for a systematic approach to the classification of disorders in the first few years of life. Since then, it has become increasingly valued by mental health professionals, physicians, nurses, early educators, and researchers around the world, and has been published in 8 different languages in addition to the original English edition.

Current Edition

Revisions to the DC: 0-3 were published in 2005 to account for the evolution of the classification system from the time when it was first published in 1994. To be addressed were certain limitations such as the lack of criteria in some of the classification categories and the need for certain clarifications. Most importantly, new knowledge from research and clinical experience dating from almost a decade was to be incorporated.

The Diagnostic Process

The diagnostic process includes gathering a series of information regarding the child's behavior and presenting problems over some time. The information is collected by a clinician and pertains to the child's adaptation and development across different occasions and contexts.

According to the DC: 0-3R, the diagnostic process consists of two aspects: 1) the classification of disorders, and 2) the assessment of individuals. One of the primary reasons for the classification of disorders is to facilitate communication between professionals. Once a diagnosis has been made, a clinician can then make associations between their clients’ symptoms and previously existing knowledge regarding the disorders' etiology, pathogenesis, treatment, and prognosis. Furthermore, using the classification of disorders can facilitate the process of finding existing services and mental health systems that are appropriate for the particular needs of the affected child. The assessment of children thus becomes a pivotal process that is undertaken by clinicians to grant access to treatment and intervention services related to specified disorders.

Clinical assessment and diagnosis involve making observations and gathering information from multiple sources relating to the child's life in conjunction with a general diagnostic scheme. Both the DSM and ICD classification systems have evolved to use a multiaxial scheme, thus, clinicians have been using them not only for the classification of disorders but also as a guide for assessment and diagnosis. The first three axes of the DSM and ICD relate to the classification of the disorder, and the fourth and fifth relate to the assessment of the individual within their environment. Similarly, the DC: 0-3 and DC: 03R also follow a multiaxial scheme.

Classification

The DC 0-3R provides a provisional diagnosis system, focusing on multi-axial classification. The system is provisional because it recognizes the fluidity and change that may occur with more knowledge in the field. This classification system is not entirely synonymous with the DSM-IV and the ICD-10, because it concentrates on developmental issues. There is also an emphasis placed on dynamic processes, relationships, and adaptive patterns within a developmental framework. The use of this classification system imparts knowledge about the diagnostic profile of a child, and the various contextual factors that may contribute to difficulties.

The DC 0-3R functions as a reference for the earlier manifestations of problems in infants and children, which can be connected to later problems in functioning. Secondly, the categorization focuses on types of difficulties in young children that are not addressed in other classification models.

The diagnostic categories vary in the description, with more familiar categories described less. Categories that are more specific to young childhood and infancy, and newly based on clinical approaches are described in more detail. Furthermore, some categories may have subtypes to promote research, clinical awareness, and intervention planning, whereas others do not. This is important information to keep in mind when reading the DC 0-3R.

The Multi-Axial System

Axis I: Clinical Disorders

Axis 1 of the DC 0-3R provides diagnostic classifications for the primary symptoms of the presenting difficulties. These diagnoses focus on the infant or child's functioning. The primary diagnoses include:

Posttraumatic Stress Disorder: This refers to children who may be experiencing or has experienced a single traumatic event (e.g. an earthquake), a series of traumatic events (e.g. air raids), or chronic stress (e.g. abuse).  Furthermore, the nature of the trauma and its effect on the child must be contextually understood.  Specifically, attention must be paid to factors such as social context, personality factors, and the caregivers’ ability to assist with coping.
Disorders of Affect: This classification of disorders is related to the infant or child's affective and behavioral experiences. This group of disorders includes mood disorders and deprivation/maltreatment disorders.  This classification focuses on the infant or child's functioning in its entirety rather than a specific event or situation. (See Affective spectrum)
Adjustment Disorder: When considering a diagnosis of adjustment disorder, one has to examine the situational factors to determine if it is a mild disruption in the child's usual functioning (e.g. switching schools). These difficulties must also not meet the criteria for other disorders included in the categories.
Regulation Disorders of Sensory Processing: The child manifests difficulties in regulating behavioral, motor, attention, physiological, sensory, and affective processes. These difficulties can affect the child's daily functioning and relationships. (See Sensory processing disorder)
Sleep Behaviour Disorder: To diagnose a sleep disorder, the child should be showing a sleep disturbance and not be demonstrating sensory reactive or processing difficulties. This diagnosis should not be used when sleep problems are related to issues of anxiety or traumatic events.
Eating Behaviour Disorder: This diagnosis may become evident in infancy and young childhood as the child may show difficulties in regular eating patterns. The child may not be regulating feeding with physiological reactions of hunger. This diagnosis is primarily in the absence of traumatic, affective, and regulatory difficulties. (See Eating disorder)
Disorders of Relating and Communicating: These disorders involve difficulties in communication, in conjunction with difficulties in regulation of physiological, motor, cognitive, and many other processes.

Axis II: Relationship Classification

Axis II focuses on children and infants developing in the context of emotional relationships. Specifically, the quality of caregiving can have a strong impact on nurturance and steering a child on a particular developmental course, either adaptive or maladaptive. This particular axis concentrates on the diagnosis of a clinical issue in the relationship between the child and the caregiver. The presence of a disorder indicates difficulties in relationships. These disorders include various patterns that highlight behavior, affective, and psychological factors between the child and the caregiver.

Overinvolved
Underinvolved
Anxious/Tense
Angry/Hostile
Mixed Relationship Disorder
Abusive

Axis III: Medical and Developmental Disorders and Conditions

Axis III focuses on physical, mental, or developmental classification using other diagnostic methods. These disorders and conditions are not treated as a single diagnosis, but as a problem that may co-exist with others, as it may involve developmental difficulties.

Axis IV: Psychosocial Stressors

This axis allows clinicians to focus on the intensity of psychosocial stress, which may act as an influencing agents in infant and childhood difficulties/disorders. Psychosocial stress can have direct and indirect influences on infants and children and depends on various factors.

Axis V: Emotional and Social Functioning

Emotional and social functioning capacities can be assessed using observations of the child with primary caregivers. The essential domains of functioning can be used in these observations on a 5-point scale, that describes overall functional emotional level.

Rating Scales and Checklists

The DC: 0-3R contains four forms that aid clinicians in identifying disorders in infants and toddlers, in examining the extent of problem behaviors, and in determining the nature of external factors influencing the child.

Functional Rating Scale for Emotional and Social Functioning Capacities: to evaluate the child's communication skills and expressions of thoughts and feelings.
 The Parent-Infant Relationship Global Assessment Scale (PIR-GAS; from Axis II): to evaluate the quality of a caregiver-child relationship and identify relationship disorders.
Relationship Problems Checklist (RPCL; from Axis II): allows the clinician to identify the extent to which a caregiver-child relationship can be described by several criterion-based qualities.
Psychosocial and Environmental Stressors Checklist (from Axis IV): to provide information on the stressors experienced by the child in various contexts.

The Future of DC 0-3R

Important questions remain to be answered, despite the revisions made in the DC: 0-3R. Such questions include the following:

How can the functional adaptation of infants and children be evaluated and described independently of diagnosis?
 How can disruptive behaviors of typical development in infants and children be distinguished from disordered behaviors that lead to atypical development?
 Should Excessive Crying Disorder be considered a functional regulatory disorder? Other functional regulatory disorders include Sleeping Behaviour and Feeding Behaviour Disorders.
 Should future editions of the DC: 0-3 include a Family Axis containing information about family history of mental illness, family structure and available supports, and family culture? These aspects are all central to assessment and treatment planning.

References

Human development
Diagnosis classification